The Giants of Thessaly (released in the UK as Jason and the Golden Fleece) is a 1960 Italian-French adventure-fantasy film directed by Riccardo Freda. It is loosely based on the epic poem Argonautica by Apollonius Rhodius.

Plot 
Thessaly, overrun with barbarian invaders and beset with natural disasters, sends King Jason and his Argonauts on a search for the fabled Golden Fleece. Meanwhile, back home, his scheming cohort is plotting to get his hands on the kingdom and the queen.

The film's subplots bear some resemblance to Odysseus' odyssey including a plot by a trusted lord to seize a throne from an absent king and a desire to marry the king's faithful wife. Jason and his men encounter a queen on her island of siren witches who turns seduced men into animals much like Odysseus' encounter with the sorceress Circe. There is also a struggle against a Cyclops also reminiscent of the encounter between Odysseus and Polyphemus the Cyclops son of Poseidon.

Cast 
  as Jason 
Ziva Rodann as Creusa
Massimo Girotti as Orfeo
Alberto Farnese as Adrasto
  as Queen Gaia
Luciano Marin as Euristeo
  as Aglaia
 Alfredo Varelli as Argo 
  as Gaia's Sister 
 Nando Tamberlani as Aglaia's Father 
 Alberto Sorrentino as Licaone 
 Paolo Gozlino as Laerte 
 Raf Baldassarre as Antinoo

Release
The Giants of Thessaly was released in Italy on 6 December 1960 where it was distributed by Filmar. It grossed a total of 408 million Italian lire domestically.

Reception
In a contemporary review, the Monthly Film Bulletin noted that the script "owes very little to the legend, instead stringing together a series of action highlights, settings and characters which, if anything, have even less consistency than the strip-cartoon formula to which they owe their inspiration." The review noted that the "scaling of the colossal statue is moderately spectacular, too. The rest, including the filtered colour, is sub-Bava, let down by indifferent acting, irrelevance (what on earth is Orpheus doing in the film?) unimpressive trick-work (the island monster) and abysmal dubbing."

References

Footnotes

Sources

External links

1960s fantasy adventure films
French historical fantasy films
French fantasy adventure films
Italian historical films
Italian fantasy adventure films
1960s historical fantasy films
Films directed by Riccardo Freda
Peplum films
Films about the Argonauts
Films scored by Carlo Rustichelli
Films set in ancient Greece
Films set in the Mediterranean Sea
Sword and sandal films
Works based on the Argonautica
1960s French films
1960s Italian films